Line 1 of the Shenyang Metro is a rapid transit line running from west to east Shenyang. It was opened on 27 September 2010. This line is 27.80 km long with 22 stations.

Opening timeline

Stations (west to east)

Rolling stock

Future
Construction started on 26 December 2020.

References

01
Railway lines opened in 2010
2010 establishments in China